University at Buffalo School of Dental Medicine is a school of dentistry located on the campus of the University at Buffalo in the United States city of Buffalo. The school is one of only two public dental schools in the state of New York along with the State University of New York at Stony Brook School of Dental Medicine.

History 
The University at Buffalo School of Dental Medicine is a part of State University of New York. The school was established in 1892.

The Academic Ranking of World Universities (ARWU) ranked the UB dental school #10 in nation and #11 in the world in dentistry and oral sciences.

Departments 
State University of New York at Buffalo School of Dental Medicine includes the following departments:
Department of Oral and Maxillofacial Surgery
Department of Oral Biology
Department of Oral Diagnostic Sciences
Department of Orthodontics
Department of Pediatric and Community Dentistry
Department of Periodontics and Endodontics
Department of Restorative Dentistry

Accreditation 
State University of New York at Buffalo School of Dental Medicine is currently accredited by American Dental Association.

Notable alumni

 Carl F. Gugino

See also

American Student Dental Association

References 

Dental schools in New York (state)
Dental Medicine
Educational institutions established in 1892
1892 establishments in New York (state)